{{DISPLAYTITLE:C33H38N4O6}}
The molecular formula C33H38N4O6 (molar mass: 586.67 g/mol) may refer to:
 Irinotecan, a drug used for the treatment of cancer
 Phycocyanobilin, a blue phycobilin
 Phycoerythrobilin, a red phycobilin